Profoto is a Swedish company that develops photographic flashes and other light shaping tools for professional photographers.

It was founded in 1968 by Conny Dufgran and Eckhard Heine in Stockholm.

History
Profoto AB was founded in Stockholm, 1968, by Conny Dufgran, photography equipment retailer, and Eckhard Heine, photographer and engineer. Several notable professionals have used different Profoto products during their careers, such as Annie Leibovitz, Herb Ritts, and David LaChapelle.

Products
The product range is mainly focused on studio photography, and includes battery powered flash generators for situations where portability is needed. There are remote control units that can be attached to a digital camera's flash socket and take advantage of flash synchronization and automatic through-the-lens measuring functionalities. Profoto also sells speed rings, softboxes, rasters, and other tools that shape the light cone. The battery powered AirTTL flash units B1 and B2 have been noted for their robustness and portability. At Photokina 2016 in Germany, Profoto launched AirTTL studio flashes D2 and Pro-10, as well as the Air Remote TTL-S which was made in collaboration with Sony.

References

External links

Swedish brands
Photographic lighting
Photography companies of Sweden
Electronics companies established in 1968
Swedish companies established in 1968
Companies based in Stockholm County